Ali Baba is a character from the folk tale Ali Baba and the Forty Thieves".

Ali Baba  or Alibaba may also refer to:

Films
 Ali Baba and the Forty Thieves (1902 film), a French film directed by Ferdinand Zecca
 Ali Baba (1940 film), an Urdu/Hindi fantasy film directed by Mehboob Khan
 Ali Baba (1973 film), an Indian animated film directed by Rohit Mohra
 Ali Baba (1991 film), an Australian animated television film produced by Burbank Animation Studios
 Alibhabha, a 2008 Tamil film by Neelan K. Sekar

Television
 Ali Baba: Dastaan-E-Kabul a 2022, Indian TV series

Opera
 Ali Baba (Cherubini), 1833 opera by Luigi Cherubini
 Ali-Baba (Lecocq), 1887 opera by Charles Lecocq

People
 Alibaba Akporobome, Nigerian comedian, stage name Ali Baba
 Nicolae Constantin Batzaria or Ali Baba (1874–1952), Aromanian writer
 Mircea Demetriade or Ali-Baba (1861–1914), Romanian writer
 Ali Baba Taj (born 1977), Urdu poet
 Ali Baba (writer) (1940–2016), Sindhi writer
 Ali Baba (wrestler) (1901–1981), Armenian American professional wrestler

Other uses
 Alibaba Group, a Chinese multinational technology company specializing in e-commerce, retail, Internet, and technology
 Ali Baba (business), a business practice in Malaysia and Indonesia to take advantage of affirmative action provisions
 Ali Baba (crater), a crater on Saturn's moon Enceladus
 Ali Baba (ride), a type of gondola ride
 Ali Baba, an ethnic slur for an Iraqi
 Alibaba Saluja, the main character from the manga/anime Magi: The Labyrinth of Magic loosely based on the original character

See also
 "The Adventurous Exploit of the Cave of Ali Baba", a short story by Dorothy L. Sayers featuring Lord Peter Wimsey, collected in Lord Peter Views the Body
 Ali Baba and the Forty Thieves (disambiguation)
 Ali Babacan (born 1967), Turkish politician